A partial solar eclipse will occur on Tuesday, June 12, 2029. A solar eclipse occurs when the Moon passes between Earth and the Sun, thereby totally or partly obscuring the image of the Sun for a viewer on Earth. A partial solar eclipse occurs in the polar regions of the Earth when the center of the Moon's shadow misses the Earth.

The eclipse will be visible from Northern and Central Europe, northern Russia, Arctic, Greenland, and northern North America.

Images 
Animated path

Related eclipses

Solar eclipses 2029–2032

Saros 118 

It is a part of Saros cycle 118, repeating every 18 years, 11 days, containing 72 events. The series started with partial solar eclipse on May 24, 803 AD. It contains total eclipses from August 19, 947 AD through October 25, 1650, hybrid eclipses on November 4, 1668 and November 15, 1686, and annular eclipses from November 27, 1704 through April 30, 1957. The series ends at member 72 as a partial eclipse on July 15, 2083. The longest duration of total was 6 minutes, 59 seconds on May 16, 1398.

Metonic cycle

References

External links 

2029 in science
2029 06 12
2029 06 12